The National Assembly (French: Assemblée nationale) was a French legislative body elected on 8 February 1871 in the wake of the Armistice of Versailles signed on 26 January 1871 at the end of the Franco-Prussian War. It sat in Bordeaux until 20 March 1871, when it moved to the Palace of Versailles. The cabinets which issued from it governed France from 19 February 1871 to 31 December 1875.

See also
 Commune of Paris
 French Constitutional Laws of 1875

Sources
 Bernard Noël, Dictionnaire de la Commune, Flammarion, collection Champs, 1978
 Jean-Pierre Azéma et Michel Winock, Naissance et mort. La Troisième République, Collection Pluriel, 1978
 Antoine Olivesi et André Nouschi, La France de 1848 à 1914, Nathan Université, collection fac Histoire, 1997.

Franco-Prussian War